Saskatoon—Rosetown—Biggar (formerly known as Saskatoon—Rosetown) was a federal electoral district in Saskatchewan, Canada, that was represented in the House of Commons of Canada from 1997 to 2015.

Geography
The district consisted of the southwestern quadrant of Saskatoon and the surrounding southwestern rural area which included the towns of Biggar, Rosetown and Delisle.

History
It was created in 1996 as "Saskatoon—Rosetown" from Kindersley—Lloydminster, Saskatoon—Clark's Crossing, Saskatoon—Dundurn and The Battlefords—Meadow Lake ridings.

In 1997, it was renamed "Saskatoon—Rosetown—Biggar".

This riding was the closest in Saskatchewan in 2008, when it was decided by fewer than 300 votes. The major parties nominated the same candidates in 2011 as they did in 2008. The incumbent was Conservative Kelly Block, an administrator from Saskatoon. She held the riding against Delisle farmer and National Farmers Union activist Nettie Wiebe.

Following the Canadian federal electoral redistribution, 2012, the riding was abolished.  The Saskatoon portion became part of Saskatoon West, while the rural portions joined Carlton Trail—Eagle Creek and Battlefords—Lloydminster.

Members of Parliament

Election results

Note: Conservative vote is compared to the total of the Canadian Alliance vote and Progressive Conservative vote in the 2000 election.

Note: Canadian Alliance vote is compared to the Reform vote in the 1999 by-election.

See also
 List of Canadian federal electoral districts
 Past Canadian electoral districts

References

Notes

External links
 
 
 Expenditures – 2008
 Expenditures – 2004
 Expenditures – 2000
 Expenditures – 1997
 Website of the Parliament of Canada

Former federal electoral districts of Saskatchewan
Politics of Saskatoon
Biggar, Saskatchewan
Rosetown